Thomas George Gregson (7 February 1796 – 4 January 1874) was the second Premier of Tasmania, serving from 26 February 1857 until 25 April 1857.

Early life
Gregson was born in Buckton, Northumberland, England, the son of John Gregson who was the nephew of Anthony Gregson, Snr. (d. 1806) the squire of Lowlynn.  John Gregson possibly lived at Lowlynn with his family but was not the landowner of that estate.   In 1806 Anthony Gregson Jnr inherited: Thomas George Gregson was to inherit from his bachelor cousin Anthony Gregson but after a family dispute Lowlynn passed to another family member a Henry Knight, son of the Rev. Thomas Knight of Ford.   Thomas Gregson was educated in Edinburgh and migrated to Van Diemen's Land, (later renamed Tasmania) in 1821 with his wife as the result of the family differences. He brought over £3000 with him and was given a grant of 2500 acres (10 km²). Subsequently, he received an additional 1000 acres (4 km²). Gregson was made a magistrate and in 1825 was assisting Andrew Bent in his conflict with Governor Arthur for the liberty of the press.

Political career
In July 1842 Gregson became a member of the Tasmanian Legislative Council, and three years later led the opposition to the governor, Sir Eardley-Wilmot, in his attempt to raise the import duties. Shortly afterwards he resigned with five other members as a protest against the voting of expenditure the colony could not bear, and, among other things, the statement by the governor that he would carry the estimates by his casting vote. The six members became known as "the patriotic six" and Gregson was presented by the colonists with two thousand guineas and a piece of plate. At the end of 1850 he was elected to the new legislative council, and, when responsible government was granted, was elected a member of the Tasmanian House of Assembly for Richmond in September 1856 and held the seat for many years. On 14 February 1857 Gregson moved and carried a motion in favour of reductions in the salaries of the governor, colonial secretary, colonial treasurer and attorney-general. The William Champ ministry resigned and Gregson became premier and colonial secretary. But he was found to be unsuitable for his office; he lacked moderation, self-control and tact, and his government was defeated about eight weeks later. He was never in office again, though often a turbulent critic of other administrations. In January 1862 he was more than once committed to the custody of the sergeant-at-arms and was once expelled from the house. He retired from parliament not long before his death at Risdon on 4 January 1874. He was survived by his wife and two spinster daughters; a son John Compton Gregson (died 1867) was a Hobart barrister and attorney-general in the Gregson cabinet.

Legacy
Gregson was also an amateur artist and exhibited at the first art exhibitions held in Hobart in 1845 and 1846. He is represented in the Beattie collection at Launceston by a sketch of the Rev. Robert Knopwood on his white horse. He worked hard for the good of the colony to the neglect of his own interests for he died comparatively poor. Gregson was particularly important as a reformer in his early days, fighting for the liberty of the press, for trial by jury, and the abolishment of penal transportation. His 58 days in office marks the shortest tenure of any Tasmanian Premier.

References

F. C. Green, 'Gregson, Thomas George (1796 - 1874)', Australian Dictionary of Biography, Volume 1, MUP, 1966, pp 475–476. Retrieved on 28 December 2008
 
 

1796 births
1874 deaths
Premiers of Tasmania
Members of the Tasmanian House of Assembly
Members of the Tasmanian Legislative Council
Leaders of the Opposition in Tasmania
English emigrants to colonial Australia
People from Richmond, Tasmania
19th-century Australian politicians